Upper Armenia ( Bardzr Hayq) was the first province of the ancient kingdom of Armenia, located in present-day Turkey, roughly corresponding to the modern province of Erzincan, to the west of the Kura River. Within the borders of the kingdom, it was bounded by the regions of Sophene, Turuberan, Tayk, and Ayrarat. It was called Upper Armenia, as it was higher in elevation than the other provinces.

It consisted of 9 cantons:
 Daranaghi
 Aghyun
 Mzur
 Yekeghyats
 Mananaghi
 Derjan
 Sper
 Shaghagom
 Karin

History
Upper Armenia was famous for its lakes, rivers (especially the Euphrates), gold mines and fields. In the 2nd millennium BC, Upper Armenia's western parts were conquered by Hittite Empire; from the 15th century BC, it was conquered by Hayasa-Azzi. From 189 BC, it became part of the Kingdom of Armenia. Upper Armenia was famous for its pagan temples. From 62 AD, it became part of the Arsacid Dynasty of Armenia. As it was an outlying province it served as a defense shield against enemies. According to Pavstos Buzand, Armenian Arsacid Kings were buried in Ani (Upper Armenia). In 387, Upper Armenia passed to the Roman Empire. It was renamed into Inner Armenia, which was ruled by a Count. Inner Armenia's capital was Teodosupolis (Karin). During the reign of Justinian I, Inner Armenia was made a province with the name of First Armenia. In the 8th century, western parts of Upper Armenia were conquered by Arabs, thereafter many Arab tribes settled in the border regions in order to separate Armenia from the Byzantine Empire. In 885, Upper Armenia became part of Bagratuni Kingdom of Armenia. In the 11th century,  Upper Armenia was once again conquered by the Byzantine Empire. In 1071, it passed to the Seljuq dynasty; in 1157, it was conquered by the Sultanate of Rum. In 1207, Upper Armenia's eastern parts were liberated by Zakarids. In 1242, Mongols conquered Upper Armenia; in 1502, it was conquered by Persia; in 1514 by the Ottoman Empire. Upper Armenia maintained a large Armenian population until the Armenian genocide in 1915.

See also
List of regions of old Armenia

References

Mack Chahin, The Kingdom of Armenia 

Provinces of the Kingdom of Armenia (antiquity)
History of Erzincan Province
Western Armenia